Honoré Ngbanda (5 May 1946 – 21 March 2021) was a Congolese politician and diplomat. He served as Minister of Defense under President Mobutu Sese Seko.

References

1946 births
2021 deaths
Defence ministers of the Democratic Republic of the Congo
20th-century Democratic Republic of the Congo politicians
People from Mongala
21st-century Democratic Republic of the Congo people